The 1972 Cal State Fullerton Titans football team represented California State University, Fullerton as a member of the California Collegiate Athletic Association (CCAA) during the 1972 NCAA College Division football season. Led by first-year head coach Pete Yoder, Cal State Fullerton compiled an overall record of 7–4 with a mark of 2–2 in conference play, placing second in the CCAA. The Titans played home games at Santa Ana Stadium in Santa Ana, California.

Schedule

References

Cal State Fullerton
Cal State Fullerton Titans football seasons
Cal State Fullerton Titans football